Aloinopsis spathulata is a species of succulent plant in the genus Aloinopsis native to South Africa. It has spoon-shaped green leaves patterned with tubercles, and unlike the yellow flowers of most in its genus, it has magenta to pink blooms. Able to grow in Sutherland, the coldest town in South Africa, it is particularly frost hardy.

References

rubrolineata
Plants described in 1954